Noah Lyon (born September 11, 1979) is a multidisciplinary artist based in New York City.

A graduate of the Cooper Union for the Advancement of Science and Art, Noah Lyon works in drawing, painting, artist's books, sound art, and installation. He is the founder of Retard Riot, a network of radical individuals devoted to art, music, and philosophy.  
Under several different monikers (most commonly Doctor Ninja) he practices the art of cultural criticism, turntablism and plunderphonics. Beside his fine art career he maintains a prolific output of underground ephemera including Retard Riot zines, radio broadcasts, CD-R's, cassettes, stickers, flyers, collaborative tape music and buttons. His work is in the permanent collections of the Tate Britain and the Museum of Modern Art, The Menil Collection and The Whitney Museum of American Art.

Paintings and drawings 

Lyon as an artist has been compared to Pablo Picasso not because of his aesthetics but rather the brut instinct, intimacy and intuitive playfulness that his work reflects. The content of his drawings and paintings are more akin to the work of Hieronymus Bosch according to European art critic Thomas Millroth, “With a fantastic imagination à la Bosch Lyon gets his nourishment from popular culture, news flow, contemporary society, international politics and doomsday prophecies.”   His work has been noted for its bold pop art imagery, surrealism and social criticism. Lyon often collides brightly colored minimalism with image saturated sensory overload aesthetics. His artwork was featured regularly in Fort Thunder’s Paper Rodeo.

Noah Lyon buttons 

Noah Lyon has created and continues to develop a series of one inch pin-back buttons, creating thousands of hand drawn designs and original texts. The buttons contain a mix of political satire, absurdist propaganda, social critique and simple observations. They are sold en masse by the Los Angeles County Museum of Art, New Museum of Contemporary Art   and the Whitney Museum of American Art.

Exhibition history 

Noah Lyon has exhibited extensively throughout Europe and the United States in galleries and museums including MoMA PS1, MOCA LA, Art Basel, The Armory Show, Printed Matter Inc., Anthology Film Archives, Deitch Projects, Brändström & Stene, Galleri Thomas Wallner and others. His work has been included in museum exhibitions with Andy Warhol, Robert Rauschenberg, Kenneth Anger and other influential American artists.

References 

Collision Feast: Noah Lyon “Look At All Your Stuff” - review by Thomas Millroth, Sydsvenkan April 30, 2009
Collision Feast: Noah Lyon “Look At All Your Stuff” by Thomas Millroth ENGLISH Translation
Holland Cotter, Art in Review New York Times. Tuesday, June 25, 2004
Yasha Wallin Child’s Play: artist Noah Lyon HEEB Magazine #13, 2007
"Sensory Overload Intriguing Images at Gallery Agniel" The Phoenix Providence, RI March 1, 2006
James Wagner "Noah Lyon at Home" February 8, 2007
Furtherfield UK on Retard Riot
Roberta Smith, Art in Review, New York Times. August 6, 2004
James Wagner - Art is the Personal and the Political
The World’s Best Ever – Retard Riot
 Dagens Nyheter Stockholm, Sweden “Toys R Us” review April 18, 2008
Noah Lyon official website
Norrköpings Konstmuseum in SWEDEN
Village Voice - Art Review by R.C. Baker - Best In Show August 15, 2006
Artkrush - Psychedelic Solutions
Dossier Journal - Noah Lyon
Cluster Mag: The Best of the 2011 NY Art Book Fair
The Tourist - Tell Us #12 : Noah Lyon
Collection Of The Month: Noah Lyon - Weirdos
Vogue - Comme des Garçons Shirt
Financial Times - Comme des Garçons SS/17 Paris Menswear

External links
Noah Lyon official website

Living people
1979 births
American artists